Fort Beshangarh is a (former) fort in  Manoharpur, Jaipur district, Rajasthan, India built in the 18th century on a single granite hill.

Its history dates back to the Shahpura royalty.

Since 2017, it houses a five-star hotel (Alila Hotels and Resorts) providing 59 suites.

See also
 List of forts in India
 List of hotels: Countries I#India

References

18th-century forts in India
Hotels in Rajasthan
Forts in Rajasthan
Hotels established in 2017